The VN-4, nicknamed the "Rhinoceros", is a multi-role light armoured personnel carrier that can be used for police forces, armored troops, peacekeeping and anti-terrorism.

Development
The VN-4 was unveiled in 2009 and is produced in China by Chongqing Tiema Industries Corporation, a China North Industries Corporation (NORINCO) company.

Description
The VN-4 is a light armored vehicle that can be outfitted for certain scenarios. It is very mobile with a top speed of 115 km/h and has independent suspension for rough terrain. The armor is welded shut and primarily provides protection from small arms fire and splinters from explosives.

Features
Air conditioning is provided to occupants from vents on the roof.
Communication systems
CTIS (central tyre inflation system)
GPS
Night vision driving capability
Video Surveillance Systems

Service history

Crisis in Bolivarian Venezuela

In the beginning of 2014, 191 VN-4s existed in Venezuela. In 2014, during the 2014 Venezuelan protests, the Venezuelan government ordered 300 additional VN-4 vehicles. The VN-4 was heavily relied upon by the Bolivarian National Guard during the crisis in Bolivarian Venezuela against demonstrators who opposed the government of President Nicolas Maduro. As demonstrations strengthened during the 2017 Venezuelan protests, President Maduro hastily ordered an additional 165 VN-4s from Norinco, paying fully for the equipment which arrived only weeks after the order, with the move being criticized since the low amount of funds allocated toward goods for Venezuelans had resulted with shortages in Venezuela during the preceding years.

Operators

:
 Bolivarian National Guard
 Bolivarian National Police
: Kenya Police - GS Unit
 : Nepalese Army - 63, bought for peacekeeping missions

References

External links

 VN4 on manufacturer's website 

Armoured fighting vehicles of the People's Republic of China
Wheeled armoured personnel carriers
Norinco
Military vehicles introduced in the 2000s
Armoured personnel carriers of the post–Cold War period